The Little River is a  river in New Hampshire and Massachusetts in the United States. It is a tributary of the Merrimack River, part of the Gulf of Maine watershed.

The Little River rises in Kingston, New Hampshire, flows south through Plaistow, and enters the city of Haverhill, Massachusetts, where it joins the Merrimack River. Most of the Little River's course is marked by suburban and urban development.

See also

List of rivers of Massachusetts
List of rivers of New Hampshire

References

Tributaries of the Merrimack River
Rivers of Essex County, Massachusetts
Rivers of New Hampshire
Rivers of Massachusetts
Rivers of Rockingham County, New Hampshire